Brahimi is a surname. Notable people with the surname include:

Abdelhamid Brahimi (1936-2021), Algerian politician and Prime Minister
Farès Brahimi, Algerian football (soccer) player
Guillaume Brahimi, French-born chef based in Sydney, Australia
Lakhdar Brahimi, chairman of a United Nations panel
Report of the Panel on United Nations Peacekeeping, more commonly referred to as the Brahimi Report, after the above chairman
Said Brahimi (1931-1997), Algerian-born French international football (soccer) player
Yacine Brahimi (born 1990), French-Algerian football player
Freeman (rapper), real name Malek Brahimi, French rapper
Princess Rym, real name Rym Brahimi, daughter of Lakhdar Brahimi, wife of Prince Ali bin Al Hussein of Jordan